Rashid Shoucair served as President of the Lebanese Scouting Federation.

In 1981, he was awarded the 151st Bronze Wolf, the only distinction of the World Organization of the Scout Movement, awarded by the World Scout Committee for exceptional services to world Scouting.

References

External links

Recipients of the Bronze Wolf Award
Year of birth missing
Scouting and Guiding in Lebanon